Fernando Guanarteme (born Tenesor Semidan) was a Guanche ally of the Spaniards who assisted them in their conquest of the Canary Islands during the late fifteenth century. He was originally from Gran Canaria. He traveled several times to the court of Ferdinand and Isabella, who served as godparents to his baptism, which was celebrated with great splendor on May 30, 1481 in the city of Calatayud.  He aided Castilians during the Battle of Aguere (1494), on the island of Tenerife.  His brother was Maninidra.

By participating in the conquest of the Canary Islands, Fernando Guanarteme is a historical figure who enjoys a popular animosity in the Canary Islands passing later tradition as a traitor par excellence of their land and culture.

References

Sources
 Gáldar
José Juan Acosta; Félix Rodríguez Lorenzo; Carmelo L. Quintero Padrón, Conquista y Colonización (Santa Cruz de Tenerife: Centro de la Cultura Popular Canaria, 1988), p. 52.

People from Gran Canaria
Guanche
Guanche people
15th-century Berber people